Lochore Welfare Junior Football and Athletic Club are a Scottish football club from the village of Crosshill, Fife. Originally formed in 1934, the club are based at Central Park and their present home colours are black and white.

History
Lochore Welfare are a club formed from mergers between various other Junior clubs over the years, firstly with local amateur side, Lochore Miners to become Lochore Miners Welfare. Then, in the late 1990s, it merged with Benarty JFC and reverted to its original name of Lochore Welfare. Crosshill was once a prosperous mining village but the decline of this industry has had a substantial impact on the community and hence the club, although the community is making strong efforts to fight against this.

The club can boast of giving some football's talented players their first footing on the ladder to success and stardom. Among these are Willie Johnston, who could often be seen playing for Lochore before going on to play for Rangers and Scotland and Ian Porterfield, whose greatest moment of glory was scoring the winning goal for Sunderland in the 1973 FA Cup Final. Craig Levein was another Lochore old boy who went on to play for Scotland and Hearts and most recently Colin Cameron.

Other Lochore players who have stepped up include Tommy Callaghan with Celtic; Cammy Fraser, Willie Gibson, Arthur Mann, Peter Oliver and Willie Benvie at Hearts; Alec Edwards with Dunfermline and Hibernian; Ian Campbell with Cowdenbeath, Dunfermline and Brechin; Jimmy Logie with Arsenal; Chris Anderson at Blackburn Rovers; Garry Patterson with Dundee.

Former player and captain James Adam took over as manager in October 2018. He is assisted by another two former players; Gary Patterson and James Davies, as well as goalkeeper coach Scott Donaldson.

Ground
Central Park has a capacity of 1,300. There is a small covered enclosure and a refreshment kiosk. The pitch itself was relaid at considerable cost to the club in 1998.  Home attendances can reach around 200 for more significant games.

Honours
Fife Junior League winners (7): 1938–39, 1947–48, 1953–54, 1955–56, 1961–62, 1962–63, 1963–64
Fife Junior (PSM) Cup (5): 1937–38, 1950–51, 1960–61, 1963–64, 1979–80
Cowdenbeath (Interbrew) Cup: 1952–53, 1955–56, 1961–62, 1963–64, 1967–68, 1974–75
Kingdom Kegs Cup: 2002–03
Express Cup: 1960–61, 1963–64
Mitchell Cup: 1937–38, 1955–56, 1961–62, 1962–63
West Fife Cup: 1937–38, 1938–39, 1948–49, 1953–54, 1954–55, 1962–63

References

Sources
 Non-League Scotland
 Scottish Football Historical Archive
 Player Database

Football clubs in Scotland
Scottish Junior Football Association clubs
Association football clubs established in 1934
Football clubs in Fife
1934 establishments in Scotland
Mining association football teams in Scotland
East of Scotland Football League teams